The expedition of Abu Bakr As-Siddiq to Nejd is supposed to have taken place in July 628 AD, third month 7AH, of the Islamic calendar.

Abu Bakr led a large platoon in Nejd on the order of Muhammad.  Many were killed and taken as prisoner.  The Sunni Hadith collection, Sunan Abu Dawud mentions the event, where Abu Bakr was the leader of the expedition:

See also
 Military career of Muhammad
 List of expeditions of Muhammad
 Muslim–Quraysh War

Notes

628
Campaigns ordered by Muhammad
Abu Bakr